Friend or Foe? is the fourth album by German alternative rock band Blackmail. The album is noted for its lyrics about depressive topics such as grief, loneliness and hatred.

Track listing

German edition 
 "Airdrop" – 3:04
 "Evon – 4:50
 "It Could Be Yours" – 2:59
 "On the Tightrope" – 3:50
 "Sunday Sister" – 3:02
 "Fast Summer" – 3:34
 "Leave" – 3:24
 "Nobody's Home (In My Home I'm Alone)" – 2:25
 "Dive" – 2:52
 "All Mine" – 3:25
 "Friend" – 9:36

International edition 
 "Airdrop" – 3:04
 "Evon" – 4:52
 "It Could Be Yours" – 2:59
 "On the Tightrope" – 3:50
 "Foe" – 3:16 (Released on Japan edition)
 "Sunday Sister" – 3:02
 "Fast Summer" – 3:34
 "Leave" – 3:24
 "Nobody's Home" – 2:23
 "Dive" – 2:52
 "All Mine" – 3:25
 "Friend" – 9:37
 "Love Like Blood" – 4:39 (Killing Joke cover/released on Japan edition)
 "Arcese" –  3:30
 "It Could Be Yours" – 2:57 (Bontempi version)
 "Nobody's Home (In My Home I'm Alone)" – 2:25

Personnel 
Aydo Abay – vocals
Kurt Ebelhäuser – guitars, backing vocals, keyboards
Carlos Ebelhäuser – bass
Mario Matthias – drums

2003 albums
Blackmail (band) albums